Anil Kumar Verma is an Indian politician of the Samajwadi Party. he is a member of the 18th Uttar Pradesh Assembly, representing the Laharpur Assembly constituency

References 

 "uplegisassembly Members main members" Uplegissembly Retrieved. 5 January 2023.
 "News18 Assembly Elections 2022 Uttar Pradesh Anil Kumar Verma Laharpur" News18. Retrieved. 05 January 2023.
 "Ourneta Neta Anil Verma" Our.Neta Retrieved 05 January 2023.

Indian politicians
Samajwadi Party politicians
Samajwadi Party politicians from Uttar Pradesh
Uttar Pradesh MLAs 2022–2027
Year of birth missing (living people)
Living people